USS SC-49, prior to July 1920 known as USS Submarine Chaser No. 49 and USS S.C. 49, was an SC-1-class submarine chaser built for the United States Navy during World War I.

SC-49 was a wooden-hulled 110-foot (34 m) submarine chaser built at the New York Navy Yard in Brooklyn, New York, and was commissioned on 27 March 1918 as USS Submarine Chaser No. 49 , abbreviated at the time as USS S.C. 49.

On 26 April 1919, 26 sailors who had traveled as passengers from Cardiff, Wales, and arrived the previous evening at New York City aboard the cargo ship  transferred from Bellingham to S.C. 49 while Bellingham was at anchor off Tompkinsville, Staten Island.

When the U.S. Navy adopted its modern hull number system on 17 July 1920, Submarine Chaser No. 49 was classified as SC-49 and her name was shortened to USS SC-49.

On 24 June 1921, the Navy sold SC-49 to Joseph G. Hitner of Philadelphia, Pennsylvania.

References 
 
 NavSource Online: Submarine Chaser Photo Archive: SC-49
 The Subchaser Archives: The History of U.S. Submarine Chasers in the Great War Hull number: SC-49
 Woofenden, Todd A. Hunters of the Steel Sharks: The Submarine Chasers of World War I. Bowdoinham, Maine: Signal Light Books, 2006. .

SC-1-class submarine chasers
World War I patrol vessels of the United States
Ships built in Brooklyn
1918 ships